The 1985 Nabisco Dinah Shore was a women's professional golf tournament, held April 4–7 at Mission Hills Country Club in Rancho Mirage, California. This was the 14th edition of the Nabisco Dinah Shore, and the third as a major championship.

Alice Miller shot a final round 67 (−5) to win her only major title, three strokes ahead of runner-up Jan Stephenson. On Saturday, Miller sank a  birdie putt on the 18th green to end the third round with a one stroke lead over Patty Sheehan and Judy Clark.

Defending champion Juli Inkster was at even par, tied for 18th place.

Final leaderboard
Sunday, April 7, 1985

References

External links
Golf Observer leaderboard

Chevron Championship
Golf in California
Nabisco Dinah Shore
Nabisco Dinah Shore
Nabisco Dinah Shore
Nabisco Dinah Shore
Women's sports in California